Old Synagogue can refer to:

 Old Synagogue (Berlin), Germany
 Old Synagogue (Canterbury), England
 Old Synagogue (Dortmund), Germany
 Old Synagogue (Dubrovnik), Croatia
 Old Synagogue (Erfurt), Germany
 Old Synagogue (Essen), Germany
 Old Synagogue (Kraków), Poland
 Old Synagogue (Przemyśl), Poland

See also 
 New Synagogue (disambiguation)
 Great Synagogue (disambiguation)